The 5th arrondissement of Lyon is one of the nine arrondissements of the City of Lyon.

History 
The 5th arrondissement was created on 24 March 1852 (date of creation of the first five arrondissements). It is the historic center of Lyon. It is at Fourvière that Munatius Plancus founded the Roman colony of Lugdunum in 43 BC. It was in this arrondissement that the Roman and medieval Lyon flourishes just before crossing the Saône.

Historic quarters of Lyon are well known, which are all touristic sites, but behind the Vieux Lyon and Fourvière, there are the residential areas of the Point du Jour, Champvert, Ménival, Saint-Irénée which remain misunderstood but still show traces of the Roman past of the city.

The Decree of 1 August 1963 linked the town of Saint-Rambert-l'Île-Barbe to the 5th arrondissement. But the following year, the district was divided, as the northern part became the 9th arrondissement of Lyon (Decree of 12 August 1964).

Geography

Area and demographics 
 
 1999 : 46,985 inhabitants
 2005 : 46,300 inhabitants
 2006 : 47,330 inhabitants
 Relative density :

Quarters 
 Vieux Lyon
 Saint-Georges
 Saint-Jean
 Saint-Paul
 Fourvière
 Saint-Just
 Saint-Irénée
 Le Point du Jour
 Champvert
 Ménival

Streets and squares 
 Montée du Gourguillon
 Rue de Gadagne
 Rue du Bœuf
 Rue Lainerie
 Place Abbé-Larue
 Place Benoît-Crépu
 Place de la Trinité

Parks
 Jardin des Curiosités
 Parc de la garde
 Parc des Hauteurs

Architecture

Monuments and buildings 
 Lyon Cathedral (Primatiale Saint-Jean)
 Basilica of Notre-Dame de Fourvière
 Église Saint-Georges
 Église Saint-Paul
 Église Saint-Just
 Église Saint-Irénée
 Théâtre antique de Fourvière
 Temple du Change
 La Tour Rose
 La galerie Philibert Delorme
 Musée Gadagne
 Maison Pauline Jaricot
 Manécanterie
 Palais de justice historique de Lyon (Cour d'appel de Lyon)
 Château de Ménival

References

External links 

 Official website